Prudence (Prue) Janet Hyman (born 23 March 1943) is a New Zealand feminist economist. She was Associate Professor of Economics and Gender and Women's Studies at Victoria University of Wellington until controversial restructuring between 2008 and 2010 abolished Gender and Women's Studies.

Hyman studies the personal aspects of economics rather than the typical corporate or governmental aspects and is frequently called on by the popular press on issues such as living wages and pay equity on which she has published widely and makes the case for the disadvantaged:  economics wildly exaggerates the productivity justifications for such wide differences [between the wealthy and the poor]. Top people essentially pay themselves and each other what they can get away with while squeezing those at the bottom. She was a founding member of, and remains a significant contributor to, the Labour, Employment and Work in New Zealand conferences at Victoria.

Hyman's 2000 report into the culture of the New Zealand Police, commissioned by the police themselves, has been cited as a major driver for change within the force.

Hyman is an out lesbian and dog-owner. Hyman played cricket for Middlesex Women Second XI 1961–1965 as well as Wellington Women.

Selected works
Women and Economics: A New Zealand Feminist Perspective 2014 
Women in CIB: Opportunities for and barriers to the recruitment, progress and retention of women in the Criminal Investigation Branch (CIB) New Zealand Police 2000
The impact of feminist analysis on economics : why so little? : how can it be increased? 1993
Review of the New Zealand Council for Recreation and Sport State Services Commission 1983 
Economic aspects of special education in New Zealand 1978

References

External links
 google scholar 
 linked-in
 institutional homepage

1943 births
Living people
New Zealand women academics
New Zealand economists
New Zealand feminists
New Zealand non-fiction writers
New Zealand women writers
New Zealand LGBT writers
Lesbian academics
Academic staff of the Victoria University of Wellington